Metynnis is a genus of serrasalmid fish from tropical and subtropical South America. They are herbivorous or omnivorous, and inhabit a wide range of freshwater habitats, ranging from rivers and streams (both fast- and slow-flowing), to floodplains, flooded forests, lakes, pools and reservoirs. The genus contains many of the species known as silver dollars in the aquarium trade.

Species
There are currently 15 recognized species in this genus:

 Metynnis altidorsalis C. G. E. Ahl, 1923
 Metynnis argenteus C. G. E. Ahl, 1923 (silver dollar)
 Metynnis cuiaba Pavanelli, Ota & Petry, 2009
 Metynnis fasciatus C. G. E. Ahl, 1931
 Metynnis guaporensis C. H. Eigenmann, 1915
 Metynnis hypsauchen (J. P. Müller & Troschel, 1844) (silver dollar)
 Metynnis lippincottianus (Cope, 1870) (spotted silver dollar)
 Metynnis longipinnis Zarske & Géry, 2008 (silver dollar)
 Metynnis luna Cope, 1878
 Metynnis maculatus (Kner, 1858) (spotted metynnis)
 Metynnis melanogrammus Ota, Rapp Py-Daniel & Jégu, 2016
 Metynnis mola C. H. Eigenmann & C. H. Kennedy, 1903
 Metynnis orinocensis (Steindachner, 1908)
 Metynnis otuquensis C. G. E. Ahl, 1923
 Metynnis polystictus Zarske & Géry, 2008 (silver dollar)

References

Fish of South America
Ray-finned fish genera
Serrasalmidae
Taxa named by Edward Drinker Cope